Alexandra Borbély (born 4 September 1986) is a Slovakian theater and film actress acting in Hungarian films, notable for playing the role of Mária in the film On Body and Soul.

Biography 
She was born in Nitra (then part of Czechoslovakia), and has two siblings: younger brother Dávid and sister Dominika. She is the member of the Hungarian minority in Slovakia.

Borbély graduated from a high school in Komárno and from the Academy of Performing Arts in Bratislava, and subsequently went to Budapest to study acting. Since her graduation in 2012 from the University of Theatre and Film Arts, she works at the József Katona Theater in Budapest. In 2017 she won the Best Actress award at the European Film Awards for her performance in On Body and Soul.

Filmography 
 Swing (2014)
 On Body and Soul (2017)

References

External links
 

1986 births
Living people
Hungarian film actresses
Hungarian stage actresses
European Film Award for Best Actress winners
People from Nitra
Hungarians in Slovakia